Alan Sinclair may refer to:

 Alan Sinclair (rower) (born 1985), British rower
 Alan Sinclair (footballer) (1900–1972), Australian rules footballer
 Alan Sinclair (scientist) (born 1952), clinical scientist and diabetes specialist